Angela Bogdan is a current Canadian diplomat. She was concurrently appointed High Commissioner to Sri Lanka and Maldives.

Bogdan joined the Foreign Affairs Canada in 1984 and has served in different postings around Europe, including the Canadian delegation to NATO.

On 4 February 2013 she was appointed Chief of Protocol.

References

External links 
 Foreign Affairs and International Trade Canada Complete List of Posts

Year of birth missing (living people)
Living people
Place of birth missing (living people)
Ambassadors of Canada to Yugoslavia
High Commissioners of Canada to the Maldives
High Commissioners of Canada to Sri Lanka
Canadian women ambassadors